Doga may refer to:

 Doga language, an Oceanic language of Papua New Guinea
 Doga (yoga), dog yoga
 Doga Gewog, a village block of Paro District, Bhutan
 Doga (Baill.) Baill. ex Nakai, a synonym of Storckiella Seem.

People
 Eugen Doga (born 1937), Moldovan composer
 Alessandro Doga (born 1975), Italian footballer

Fictional characters

 Doga, also known as Dorga, a character in Final Fantasy III
 Doga (comics), a character in Raj Comics
 Doga, an evil witch in Pucca; See List of characters in Pucca